The 1979–80 Virginia Cavaliers men's basketball team represented University of Virginia and was a member of the Atlantic Coast Conference. It was Ralph Sampson's freshman year with the Cavaliers.

Roster

Schedule

|-
!colspan=9 style="background:#00214e; color:#f56d22;"| Regular season

|-
!colspan=9 style="background:#00214e; color:#f56d22;"| ACC Tournament

|-
!colspan=9 style="background:#00214e; color:#f56d22;"| National Invitation Tournament

Awards and honors
 Jeff Lamp, 3rd Team UPI All-American
 Jeff Lamp, 2nd Team All-ACC
 Ralph Sampson, NIT Most Valuable Player
 Ralph Sampson, ACC Rookie of the Year

NBA draft

References

Virginia Cavaliers men's basketball seasons
Virginia
Virginia
National Invitation Tournament championship seasons
Virgin
Virgin